Andrew West  was the Vice Chancellor of Lincoln University, New Zealand from 2012 to June 2015.

West holds a degree in ecology at the University of Westminster, and has a PhD from the Council for National Academic Awards. Prior to becoming Vice-Chancellor at Lincoln, West was the Chief Executive at GNS Science and Chief Executive at AgResearch. He also had leading positions at the Tertiary Education Commission and the New Zealand Qualifications Authority. He is a Companion of the Royal Society Te Apārangi.

References

External links 

Lincoln University Website

Year of birth missing (living people)
Living people
Alumni of the University of Westminster
Academic staff of the Lincoln University (New Zealand)
Companions of the Royal Society of New Zealand